Helen Gordon is the chief executive designate of the FTSE 250 Index listed company Grainger plc. She replaced Andrew Cunningham when he retired from the position in February 2016.

Gordon is a board member of the New Covent Garden Market Authority and an Advisory Board member of Cambridge University Land Economy Department. she was a Trustee of the College of Estate Management for nine years.

References

Helen spent a number of years with Railtrack establishing a strong internal property development team and extensive development pipeline obtaining many highly valuable consents and forming major joint ventures with the likes Of Gazeley, Pillar Property, British Land and others. On the demise of Railtrack this was well demonstrated by the sale of its assets to the market at significant added value.

Living people
Year of birth missing (living people)
British chief executives